Reginald Cecil "Rex" Robinson (26 June 1926 – 13 April 2015) was a British actor.

He appeared in three Doctor Who serials directed by Lennie Mayne: as Dr. Tyler in The Three Doctors, Gebek in The Monster of Peladon and Dr. Carter in The Hand of Fear. Other acting roles include Z-Cars, No Hiding Place, The Onedin Line, Within These Walls, Terry and June, The Professionals, Only Fools and Horses, Yes Minister, and the films A Nightingale Sang in Berkeley Square and Superman IV: The Quest for Peace, and a one-off appearance in Are You Being Served?.

Filmography

References

External links

Obituary
 
Rex Robinson at Theatricalia

1926 births
2015 deaths
English male television actors
People from Derby